Attash may refer to:
 Abd al-Malik ibn Attash, Fatimid da'i involved in Muhammad Tapar's anti-Nizari campaign
 Attash Durrani (1952–2018), Pakistani writer
 Hassan bin Attash (born 1985), Juvenile held at Guantanamo Bay
 Walid bin Attash (born 1978), Yemeni prisoner
 Attash v. Bush, Habeas corpus petition